Dr Hanan Rubin (born Hans Rubin on 10 August 1908, died 24 October 1962) was a German-born Israeli politician who served as a member of the Knesset between 1949 and 1962.

Biography
Born in Berlin, Rubin was a member of the Blue-White movement during his youth.  After school he studied law at the Humboldt University of Berlin and University of Freiburg, receiving his law doctorate in 1932.  Whilst at university, he was a member of the central committee of the Federation of Student Unions.  In 1930 he joined the Social Democratic Party, before switching to the small left-wing Socialist Workers' Party.

In 1933 Rubin made aliyah to Mandatory Palestine, where he initially worked as an agricultural laborer, before starting working for the Histadrut trade union in 1934.  He was amongst the founders of the Socialist League in 1936, and was a member of the Assembly of Representatives. After this merged into the Hashomer Hatzair Workers Party, and then Mapam, he was amongst the leaders of the new party. In the 1949 elections he was elected to the Knesset on Mapam's list. He was re-elected in 1951, 1955, 1959 and 1961, serving as Deputy Speaker for his last three terms.  He died on 24 October 1962 and was replaced by Yosef Kushnir.

References

External links

1908 births
1962 deaths
Politicians from Berlin
Jewish emigrants from Nazi Germany to Mandatory Palestine
Humboldt University of Berlin alumni
University of Freiburg alumni
Members of the Assembly of Representatives (Mandatory Palestine)
Israeli trade unionists
Jewish socialists
Social Democratic Party of Germany politicians
Mapam politicians
Members of the 1st Knesset (1949–1951)
Members of the 2nd Knesset (1951–1955)
Members of the 3rd Knesset (1955–1959)
Members of the 4th Knesset (1959–1961)
Members of the 5th Knesset (1961–1965)